KWJG (91.5 FM) was a non-commercial radio station in Kasilof, Alaska, broadcasting to the Kenai, Alaska, area.

The station's license was cancelled by the Federal Communications Commission on February 27, 2020, due to KWJG's extended period of silence.

See also
List of community radio stations in the United States

External links

WJG
Radio stations established in 1999
1999 establishments in Alaska
Defunct radio stations in the United States
Radio stations disestablished in 2020
2020 disestablishments in Alaska
Defunct community radio stations in the United States
WJG